Nanna W. Jørgensen (born 20 November 1989) is a Danish motorcycle speedway rider, who is the first woman in Polish league.

She started since 2007 season in Denmark and Ukraine. In 2008 season she started in tournament in Tarnów "Eurospeedway" and she beat a few men. Between 2008 and 2009 seasons there was a change of Polish regulations and since 2009 season woman can start in motorcycle speedway meetings. Jørgensen is the first woman who signed a contract with Polish motorcycle speedway club (KM Ostrów Wielkopolski).

Her parents are Steen and Joan. She has one brother Christoffer.

See also 
 Speedway in Poland

References

External links 
 (en) Nanna-Racing.com

Danish speedway riders
1989 births
Living people